Little Eva may refer to:
 A character in Uncle Tom's Cabin (1852), an anti-slavery novel
 A character in Little Eva: The Flower of the South (1853), a pro-slavery novel
 Bill Lange (1871–1950), 1890s sports star
 Little Eva Narcissus Boyd (1943–2003), 1960s pop star
 "Little Eva", a song by the Tom Tom Club from Boom Boom Chi Boom Boom
 Little Eva (aircraft), a B-24 of the U.S. Army Air Forces that crashed during World War II.
 Little Eva, a cartoon-character series (1952–1956) by St. John Publications